Waldemar Chiarelli (born 4 March 1936) is a Brazilian footballer. He played in five matches for the Brazil national football team in 1959. He was also part of Brazil's squad for the 1959 South American Championship that took place in Ecuador.

References

External links
 

1936 births
Living people
Brazilian footballers
Brazil international footballers
Association football goalkeepers
Footballers from São Paulo (state)